Balmacara Bay is a remote wide mouthed embayment on a 193° orientation, located on the north shore of the Lochalsh peninsula, on the north coast of sea loch of Loch Alsh and is situated next to the scattered village of Balmacara in the Scottish Highlands in the west coast of Scotland.

Settlements
The 2750-hectare crofting estate of Balmacara Estate was bequeathed to the people of Scotland via the National Trust of Scotland. The estate was bequeathed in 1946 by Lady Margaret Hamilton after her death. In 1954, the Lochalsh House was conveyed to the Trust.

The A87 road passed Balmacara and the bay, following the northern coast of Lochalsh. Balmacara Hotel, overlooking the Isle of Skye is located on Balmacara Bay. To the west of the bay is Kyle of Lochalsh and further west, heading north on the peninsula is Erbusaig Bay, to the east is Nostie Bay

Geography
Balmacara Bay is on the north shore of Loch Alsh. To the south of the bay, at about 1 km can be seen the opening of Kyle Rhea that separates the mainland of Scotland from the Isle of Skye, with Beinn na Caillich at 732metres to the right of the opening. Further to the east of the opening is the small hill of Glas Bheinn at 397metres. Further east again, and clearly visible from the bay, is the village of Ardintoul and Ardintoul Bay and Ardintoul point.

Auchtertyre Hill at 452m is the most imposing feature behind the bay. To the west of the bay, is the opening of the sea loch, Kyle Akin, which has a small number of islands, including Eileanan Dubha and Eilean Bàn which the A87 road to Kyle of Lochalsh travels over, although not visible from the bay. Slightly south of Kyle of Lochalsh is Kyleakin peninsula and the Rubha Àrd Treisis point, is the opening for the sea loch Loch na Beiste, which is visible from the bay. Behind and to the west of the bay, on the Lochalsh peninsula, is mostly flat.

Gallery
The following images, detail the surrounding area, including the village of Balmacara, the bay and those views from the bay.

See also
 List of lochs in Scotland
 List of reservoirs and dams in the United Kingdom

References

External links
 Oblique aerial view of the bay at Balmacara and the fish trap, taken from the SSW

Bays of Ross and Cromarty